The Vallum is a huge earthwork associated with Hadrian's Wall in England. Unique on any Roman frontier, it runs practically from coast to coast to the south of the wall.

The earliest surviving mention of the earthwork is by Bede (Historia ecclesiastica gentis Anglorum, I.12), who refers to a vallum, or earthen rampart, as distinct from the wall, or murus; the term is still used despite the fact that the essential element is a ditch, or fossa. It was long thought that the Vallum predated the stone wall, whose most elaborate phasing was presented in 1801 by William Hutton, who thought, wrongly, that the south vallum mound and the marginal mound, with a ditch between, were the work of Agricola, that the vallum ditch and north mound were added by Hadrian, and that the stone wall was the work of Severus. In fact all these elements date to Hadrian's reign, with the stone wall having been built first.

Layout and course 
For a great deal of its length a third lower mound, the so-called marginal mound occupies the south berm (flat area between mound and ditch), right on the southern lip of the ditch.

In several places – for example at Heddon-on-the-Wall and Limestone Corner – the Vallum was cut through solid rock, sometimes for lengthy distances.

The distance of the Vallum from the Wall varies. In general there was a preference for the earthwork to run close to the rear of the Wall where topography allowed.

Archaeology and purpose 
Before the middle of the 19th century, the Vallum was most commonly known as Agricola's Ditch, since antiquarians wrongly thought that it had been constructed during the period when Agricola was Governor of Britannia, the Roman province spanning what is now England, Wales and southern Scotland. After John Hodgson published the final portion of his History of Northumberland in 1840, it became generally accepted that the Wall and Vallum had been built during the reign of Hadrian. Hodgson based his view on evidence which included a stone tablet now in the Great North Museum: Hancock, Newcastle upon Tyne, which had been found in Milecastle 38 on the Wall in the previous century, its significance having been overlooked. The inscription on the tablet, probably made and erected to mark the completion of the milecastle, includes the names of Hadrian and Aulus Platorius Nepos (Governor of Britannia during Hadrian's reign), as well as "Legio II Augusta" (Second Augustan Legion). It is now accepted that units of that Roman legion built the section of Hadrian's Wall which includes the milecastle, and they would have automatically included the names of the current emperor and governor on the tablet.

The first excavation was undertaken in 1893 at Great Hill (at Heddon-on-the-Wall, to the west of Newcastle upon Tyne), where it was observed that the Vallum ditch was cut through a seam of fire-clay which was deployed in both mounds. This excavation demonstrated that the main north and south mounds were contemporary and built using material dug from the ditch. In the late 20th century several excavations established that the marginal mound was also contemporary.

The Vallum is known to have been constructed some time after the wall was completed, as it deviates to the south around several wall-forts which were either completed or under construction when the wall was nearing completion. There would have been a crossing-point like a causeway or bridge to the south of each wall-fort – several such causeways are known, such as the one still visible with the base of an ornate arch (photo above left) at the fort of Condercum in Benwell, a western suburb of Newcastle. Causeways have also been detected to the south of several milecastles.

It is thought that the easternmost section of Hadrian's Wall between the forts of Pons Aelius (Newcastle upon Tyne) and Segedunum (Wallsend) was an addition to the original plan. The Vallum was not constructed behind this extra length of the wall, indeed it did not apparently even reach the fort at Newcastle; instead it seems it stopped in the western Newcastle suburb of Elswick. This was probably because from here on the Vallum's function as a southern barrier to the wall was performed by the River Tyne.

Although there is no definitive historical evidence as to why the Roman army built this unusual barrier, modern archaeological opinion is that the Vallum established the southern boundary of an exclusion zone bounded on the north by the wall itself. The zone would have been "out-of-bounds" to civilians and those with no valid reason to be there. It might thus have been the Roman equivalent to a modern demilitarized zone or DMZ, such as the Korean Demilitarized Zone currently separating North Korea and South Korea.

Sometime in the 2nd century AD, the Vallum was "slighted" – that is, the ramparts were broken through and the ditch filled in at fairly regular intervals along its length. Archaeologists and historians have speculated that either the Vallum was then deemed unnecessary, or that it was proving to be a hindrance to military and authorised civilian traffic. Some have suggested that this coincided with the building of the Antonine Wall in Scotland and the temporary abandonment of Hadrian's Wall.

It is worth noticing at this point that the Antonine Wall was a less formidable barrier than Hadrian's Wall, for two main reasons: firstly, because it was built out of turf rather than stone; and secondly, because it had no equivalent ditch system like the Vallum behind the Wall. It may have been for these reasons that the Antonine Wall was not garrisoned for very long.

References

External links

2nd-century establishments in Roman Britain
2nd-century fortifications
Hadrian's Wall
Linear earthworks